The Schönbiel Hut (German: Schönbielhütte) is a mountain hut located north of the Matterhorn. The actual hut was built by the Swiss Alpine Club in 1955, after the demolition of an older hut, built in 1909.

The hut is accessible to hikers, from the cable car station of Schwarzsee with a marked trail. It is used to climb the Matterhorn on Zmutt ridge and many other high summits in the area (Dent d'Hérens, Dent Blanche, Ober Gabelhorn, Tête Blanche).

External links 

Official website (German, English, French)
Schönbiel Hut on SummitPost.org

Mountain huts in Switzerland
Mountain huts in the Alps